Onthophagus centricornis, is a species of dung beetle found in Sri Lanka.

Description
This elongate-oval, convex species has an average length of about 5 to 5.5 mm. Body black, shiny beneath and subopaque above. Body covered with short, erect pale setae. Pronotum dark blue, antennae yellowish. Head short and less broad. Clypeus evenly rounded and divided by a gently curved carina from the forehead. Pronotum uniformly and fairly closely studded. Elytra finely striate, with flat intervals. Pygidium shiny and fairly strongly and closely punctured. Metasternal shield with fine scattered punctures.

References 

Scarabaeinae
Beetles of Sri Lanka
Insects described in 1914